Team Chauraha Dhangadhi, often called Chauraha Dhangadhi is one of the six franchises competing on Dhangadhi Premier League. It was led by the national cricket team captain, Paras Khadka.The team represents the city of Dhangadhi in Kailali district of Nepal, and won the 2017 Dhangadhi Premier League Title, receiving a prize of 1.5 million Nepalese rupees. In the second season they defended their trophy beating Biratnagar kings. The team was led by the Nepali fast bowler Sompal Kami.The team are not participating in the 3rd edition of the Dhangadhi Premier League. The team owner is Raj Kumar Shrestha.

Squad
The current squad for DPL 2017 is:

Paras Khadka (C)
Dipendra Thapa
Rashaid Khan
Amar Singh Rautela
Prakash Jung Karki
Lalit Rajbanshi
Anil Mandal
Saurav Khanal
Prithu Baskota
Raju Rijal
Aarif Sheikh
Sushan Bhari
Aadil Khan
Ramnaresh Giri

References

Kailali District
Cricket teams in Nepal
Cricket clubs established in 2014
2014 establishments in Nepal